In popular culture, Stanley Kubrick's 1968 science fiction film 2001: A Space Odyssey has had a significant impact in such diverse cultural forms and media as film, literature, music and technology.

Influence on film
The influence of 2001 on subsequent filmmakers is considerable. Steven Spielberg, George Lucas and others, including many special effects technicians, discuss the impact the film has had on them in a featurette titled Standing on the Shoulders of Kubrick: The Legacy of 2001, included in the 2007 DVD release of the film. Spielberg calls it his film generation's "big bang", while Lucas says it was "hugely inspirational", labeling Kubrick as "the filmmaker's filmmaker". Sydney Pollack refers to it as "groundbreaking", and William Friedkin states 2001 is "the grandfather of all such films". George Lucas provided a high appraisal of Kubrick's direction of the film stating: "Stanley Kubrick made the ultimate science fiction movie, and it is going to be very hard for someone to come along and make a better movie, as far as I'm concerned. On a technical level, it can be compared, but personally I think that '2001' is far superior."

At the 2007 Venice film festival, director Ridley Scott stated he believed 2001 was the unbeatable film that in a sense killed the science fiction genre. Similarly, film critic Michel Ciment in his essay "Odyssey of Stanley Kubrick" stated, "Kubrick has conceived a film which in one stroke has made the whole science fiction cinema obsolete." However, others credit 2001 with opening up a market for films such as Close Encounters of the Third Kind, Alien, Blade Runner and Contact; proving that big-budget "serious" science-fiction films can be commercially successful, and establishing the "sci-fi blockbuster" as a Hollywood staple. Science magazine Discovers blogger Stephen Cass, discussing the considerable impact of the film on subsequent science-fiction, writes that "the balletic spacecraft scenes set to sweeping classical music, the tarantula-soft tones of HAL 9000, and the ultimate alien artifact, the Monolith, have all become enduring cultural icons in their own right."

Visual references to 2001 (including to HAL 9000), are present in both the original Star Wars film and the concluding episode, The Rise of Skywalker. The depiction of hyperspace in the original film was specifically influenced by the psychedelic visual in 2001.

Influence on media
One commentator has suggested that the image of the Star Child and Earth has contributed to the rise of the "whole Earth" icon as a symbol of the unity of humanity. Writing in The Asia Pacific Journal Robert Jacobs traces the history of this icon from early cartoons and drawings of Earth to photographs of Earth from early space missions, to its historic appearance on the cover of The Whole Earth Catalog. Noting that images of the entire planet recur several times in A Space Odyssey, Jacobs writes:

Influence on technology

In August 2011, in response to Apple Inc.'s patent infringement lawsuit against Samsung, the latter argued that Apple's iPad was effectively modeled on the visual tablets that appear aboard spaceship Discovery in the Space Odyssey film, which constitute prior art.

"Siri", Apple's voice assistant in iOS and macOS, features a reference to the film: it responds "I'm sorry I can't do that" when asked to "open the pod bay doors". When asked repeatedly, it may say, "Without your space helmet, you're going to find this rather... breathtaking.". The iPhone 6 version also included some references to HAL: initially, when the user said it was "good", it sometimes repeated what HAL says to the BBC interviewer about himself, then, when the user asked her to search information about HAL, it said that "We all know what happened to HAL..." or, later, that "at least, he was good at singing".

Inspired by Clarke's visual tablet device, in 1994 a European Commission-funded R&D project code named "NewsPAD" developed and pilot tested a portable 'multimedia viewer' aiming for the realisation of an electronic multimedia 'newspaper' pointing the way to a future fully interactive and highly personalised information source. Involved partners were Acorn RISC Technologies UK, Archimedes GR, Carat FR, Ediciones Primera Plana ES, Institut Català de Tecnologia ES, and TechMAPP UK.

Sequels 
Kubrick did not envision a sequel to 2001. Fearing the later exploitation and recycling of his material in other productions (as was done with the props from MGM's Forbidden Planet), he ordered all sets, props, miniatures, production blueprints, and prints of unused scenes destroyed. Most of these materials were lost, with some exceptions: a 2001 spacesuit backpack appeared in the "Close Up" episode of the Gerry Anderson series UFO, and one of HAL's eyepieces is in the possession of the author of Hal's Legacy, David G. Stork. In 2012 Lockheed engineer Adam Johnson, working with Frederick I. Ordway III, science adviser to Kubrick, wrote the book 2001: The Lost Science, which for the first time featured many of the blueprints of the spacecraft and film sets that previously had been thought destroyed.

Clarke wrote three sequel novels: 2010: Odyssey Two (1982), 2061: Odyssey Three (1987), and 3001: The Final Odyssey (1997). The only filmed sequel, 2010, was based on Clarke's 1982 novel and was released in 1984. Kubrick was not involved in the production of this film, which was directed by Peter Hyams in a more conventional style with more dialogue. Clarke saw it as a fitting adaptation of his novel, and had a brief cameo appearance in the film. As Kubrick had ordered all models and blueprints from 2001 destroyed, Hyams was forced to recreate these models from scratch for 2010. Hyams also claimed that he would not have made the film had he not received both Kubrick's and Clarke's blessings:

The other two novels have not been adapted for the screen, although actor Tom Hanks has expressed interest in possible adaptations.

In 2012, two screenplay adaptations of both 2061 and 3001 were posted on the 2001:Exhibit website, in the hopes of generating interest in both MGM and Warner Bros. to adapt the last two novels into films.

Comics adaptations
René Bratonne made a French newspaper comic adaptation of this film, assisted by Pierre Leguen, Claude Pascal and his son, who worked under the pseudonym Jack de Brown.

Beginning in 1976, Marvel Comics published a comic adaptation of the film written and drawn by Jack Kirby, and a 10-issue monthly series expanding on the ideas of the film and novel, also created by Kirby.

Parodies and homages

2001 has been the frequent subject of both parody and homage, sometimes extensively and other times briefly, employing both its distinctive music and iconic imagery.

In advertising and print
 Mad magazine #125 (March 1969) featured a spoof called 201 Minutes of a Space Idiocy written by Dick DeBartolo and illustrated by Mort Drucker. In the final panels it is revealed that the monolith is a film script titled "'How to Make an Incomprehensible Science Fiction Movie' by Stanley Kubrick". It was reprinted in various special issues, in the MAD About the Sixties book, and partially in the book The Making of Kubrick's 2001.
 The August 1971 album Who's Next by The Who featured as its cover artwork a photograph of a concrete slab at Easington Colliery with the band apparently doing up their trouser zips. The decision to photograph this "monolith" image while on their way to a concert followed discussion between John Entwistle and Keith Moon about Kubrick's film.
 Thought to be the first time Kubrick gave permission for his work to be re-used, Apple Inc.'s 1999 website advertisement "It was a bug, Dave" was made by meticulously recreating the appearance of HAL from the movie. Launched during the era of concerns over Y2K bugs, the ad implied that HAL's weird behavior was caused by a Y2K bug, before driving home the point that "only Macintosh was designed to function perfectly".
 A teaser trailer for the upcoming film Barbie parodies the opening sequence of 2001.

In film and television
 Woody Allen cast actor Douglas Rain (HAL in Kubrick's film) in an uncredited part as the voice of the controlling computer in the closing sequences of his 1973 science-fiction comedy Sleeper.
 Mel Brooks' 1981 satirical film History of the World, Part I opens with a parody of Kubrick's "Dawn of Man" sequence, followed by the parody of One Million Years BC, narrated by Orson Welles. DVDVerdict describes this parody as "spot on". A similar spoof of the "Dawn of Man" sequence also opened Ken Shapiro's 1974 comedy The Groove Tube in which the monolith was replaced by a television set. (The film is mostly a parody of television. Film and Filming held that after this opening, the film slid downhill.)
 Matt Groening's animated series The Simpsons, of which Kubrick was a fan, and Futurama frequently reference 2001, along with other Kubrick films. In the opening of 1991 Episode 8F06 of The Simpsons (Lisa's Pony) the 'Dawn of Man' scene from 2001 is recreated with primates that include Homer; while all the primates are inspired to new levels of intellect by the monolith, the Homer primate uses it as a back rest to take a nap. The Simpsons had in the 1994 episode "Deep Space Homer" Bart throwing a felt-tip marker into the air; in slow motion it rotates, before a match cut replaces it with a cylindrical satellite. In 2004 Empire magazine listed this as the third best film parody of the entire run of the show. The satellite docking sequence is also parodied as Homer Simpson floats through the spaceship eating potato chips. HAL's ship omnipotence, eye, murderous breakdown, and eventual disconnection are parodied through the Ultrahouse in the 2001 episode Treehouse of Horror XII, and the new house décor itself is reminiscent of the film's spaceship interiors. In the 2002 Futurama episode "Love and Rocket" a sentient spaceship revolts in a manner similar to HAL. Games Radar listed this as number 17 in its list of 20 Funniest Futurama parodies, while noting that Futurama has referenced Space Odyssey on several other occasions.
 In the 2000 South Park episode "Trapper Keeper", an interaction between Eric Cartman and Kyle Broflovski parodies the conversation between HAL and Bowman within the inner core.
 In Clueless (1997), a black blocky phone rings, which is framed to look like the monolith, while the 2001 films score is played.
 Peter Sellers starred in Hal Ashby's 1979 comedy-drama Being There about a simple-minded middle-aged gardener who has lived his entire life in the townhouse of his wealthy employer. In the scene where he first leaves the house and ventures into the wide world for the first time, the soundtrack plays a jazzy version of Strauss' Also Sprach Zarathustra arranged by Eumir Deodato. Film critic James A. Davidson writing for the film journal Images suggests "When Chance emerges from his home into the world, Ashby suggests his childlike nature by using Richard Strauss' Thus Spake Zarathustra as ironic background music, linking his hero with Kubrick's star baby in his masterpiece 2001: A Space Odyssey."
 Tim Burton's 2005 Charlie and the Chocolate Factory has a scene (using actual footage from A Space Odyssey) in which the monolith morphs into a chocolate bar. Catholic News wrote that the film "had subtle and obvious riffs on everything from the saccharine Disney "Small World" exhibit to Munchkinland to, most brilliantly, a hilarious takeoff on Kubrick's 2001: A Space Odyssey."
 Andrew Stanton, the director of WALL-E (2008), revealed in an interview with Wired magazine that his film was in many ways his homage to Space Odyssey, Alien, Blade Runner, Close Encounters and several other science-fiction films. The reviewer for USA Today described the resemblance of the spaceship's computer, Auto, to HAL. WALL-E also uses Richard Strauss's Also sprach Zarathustra during its climax in a similar manner to 2001. The same year saw the release of the much less successful film Eagle Eye, about which The Charlotte Observer said that, like 2001, it featured a "red-eyed, calm-voiced supercomputer that took human life to protect what it felt were higher objectives".
 Sesame Workshop parodied 2001 on Sesame Street with an episode in which Telly sees two monoliths appear in the arbor area (the number 11) and describes it as making one feel...elevenny, and a sketch on Square One Television that illustrates the concept of infinity; however, the most famous and well-known spoofs of 2001 from Sesame Workshop were short cartoons for The Electric Company, referred to as the "monolith" series, in which the monolith (colored white) cracked up and crumbled down due to seismic disturbance to the first Sunrise Fanfare of Also Sprach Zarathustra followed by repetitive kettledrum thumping, eventually revealing a small word or diphthong, subsequently pronounced by a deistic voice ("ee", "oo", "ow", "all", "alk", "scram", "was"). Two additional such cartoons were created for Sesame Street; "me" and "amor".
 Commenting on the broader use of Ligeti's music beyond that by Kubrick, London Magazine in 2006 mentioned Monty Python's use of Ligeti in a 60-second spoof of Space Odyssey in the Flying Circus episode commonly labeled "A Book at Bedtime".
 The poorly reviewed 2000 Canadian spoof 2001: A Space Travesty has been occasionally alluded to as a full parody of Kubrick's film, both because of its title and star Leslie Nielsen's many previous films which were full parodies of other films. However, Space Travesty only makes occasional references to Kubrick's material, its "celebrities are really aliens" jokes resembling those in the 1997 film Men in Black. Canadian reviewer Jim Slotek said, "It's not really a spoof of 2001, or anything in particular. There's a brief homage at the start, and one scene in a shuttle en route to the Moon that uses The Blue Danube... The rest is a patched together plot." 
 Among spoof references to several science-fiction films and shows, Airplane II (1982) features a computer called ROK 9000 in control of a Moon shuttle which malfunctions and kills crew members, which several reviewers found reminiscent of HAL.
 Mystery Science Theater 3000 had the design of its main setting, the starship Satellite of Love, based on the bone-shaped satellite featured in the match cut from prehistoria to the future. The one-eyed design of the robot Gypsy led the show to do various scenes comparing it to HAL, including a scene from the 1996 feature film, where the opening featuring Mike Nelson jogging along the walls of the Satellite of Love parodies the scene where Frank Poole does the same in the Discovery.
In an episode of 13 Reasons Why, two characters see a matinee of the film to pass time during the summer.

In music
 David Bowie's first single to chart, "Space Oddity" in 1969, was inspired by the film.

In software and video games
 Video game director Hideo Kojima has also cited 2001: A Space Odyssey as his favorite movie of all time and is frequently referenced in the Metal Gear series; Otacon is named after HAL and Solid Snake's real name is Dave.

In spaceflight 
 2001 Mars Odyssey is a NASA probe currently orbiting Mars, named in tribute to the film.

50th anniversary celebration
In celebration of the 50th anniversary of the film's release, an exhibit called “The Barmecide Feast” opened on April 8, 2018 in the Smithsonian Institution's National Air and Space Museum.
The exhibit features a fully realized, full-scale reflection of the iconic, neo-classical hotel room from the penultimate scene in the film.

Utah monolith

In 2020, a metallic pillar of unknown origin was discovered in Utah. It has been compared to the monolith in 2001: A Space Odyssey.

References

Citations

Bibliography
 
 

Space Odyssey
Films in popular culture